Francis Sylvester Mahony (31 December 1804 – 18 May 1866), also known by the pen name Father Prout, was an Irish humorist and journalist.

Life
He was born in Cork, Ireland, to Martin Mahony and Mary Reynolds. He was educated at the Jesuit Clongowes Wood College, Kildare, and later in the College of Saint-Acheul, a similar school in Amiens, France and then at Rue de Sèvres, Paris, and later in Rome. He began teaching at the Jesuit school of Clongowes as master of rhetoric, but was soon after expelled. He then went to London, and became a leading contributor to Fraser's Magazine, under the signature of "Father Prout" (the original Father Prout, whom Mahony knew in his youth, born in 1757, was parish priest of Watergrasshill, County Cork). Mahony at one point was director of this magazine.

He was witty and learned in many languages. One form which his humour took was the professed discovery of the originals in Latin, Greek, or mediaeval French of popular modern poems and songs. Many of these jeux d'esprit were collected as Reliques of Father Prout. He pretended that these poems had been found in Fr. Prout’s trunk after his death.  He wittily described himself as "an Irish potato seasoned with Attic salt." Later he acted as foreign correspondent to various newspapers, and during the last eight years of his life, his articles formed a main attraction of The Globe.

Mahony spent the last two years of his life in a monastery and died in Paris reconciled to the Church.

The Bells of Shandon 
In his native Cork Mahoney is best remembered for his poem "The Bells of Shandon" and his pen-name is synonymous with the city and the church of St. Anne's, Shandon.

Publications
The Reliques of Father Prout originally appeared in two volumes in 1836 with illustrations by Maclise. They were reissued in Bohn's Illustrated Library in 1860.  Another volume, Final Reliques, was edited by Douglas Jerrold and published in 1876.  The Works of Father Prout, edited by Charles Kent, was published in 1881.  Facts and Figures from Italy (1847) was made from his Rome letters to the London Daily News.

Graham Greene reference

The protagonist of Graham Greene's  Travels With My Aunt mentions regretfully his life's unfulfilled ambition "to be recognised as an English Mahony and celebrate Southwood as he celebrated Shandon"

References

General references
"Mahony, Francis Sylvester" ("Father Prout") British Authors of the Nineteenth Century. H.C Wilson Company, New York, 1936
The Cabinet of Irish Literature Volume III, Blackie & Son Limited London, 1880
https://web.archive.org/web/20070929090727/http://www.shandonbells.org/poem.htm

Attribution

External links
 The People of Ballingarry - The Story of Father Prout

1804 births
1866 deaths
Irish humorists
Former Jesuits
People from County Cork
People educated at Stonyhurst College
People educated at Clongowes Wood College
19th-century Irish Jesuits
Irish journalists
19th-century journalists
Male journalists
19th-century male writers
19th-century pseudonymous writers